Jason Rosenhouse is an American author and professor of mathematics at James Madison University, where he was originally appointed an assistant professor in 2003. He became a full professor in 2014. His research focuses on algebraic graph theory, as well as analytic number theory. He ran the blog Evolution Blog at National Geographic's ScienceBlogs, where he frequently criticized creationism. In late 2016 he announced that he was abandoning the blogging format. He has contributed to the pro-evolution blog The Panda's Thumb, and has also contributed to the Huffington Post about topics such as the Higgs boson, in addition to creationism.

Personal life
Jason grew up in New Jersey. While in middle school and high school, he was a prolific chess player, attending both tournaments and chess camp.

Education
Rosenhouse has a bachelor's degree from Brown University in mathematics (1995), and an M.A. (1997) and PhD in mathematics (2000), both from Dartmouth College. His PhD thesis was entitled "Isoperimetric numbers of certain Cayley graphs associated to PSL (2, [zeta subscript n])".

Career
In 2000, Rosenhouse accepted a position at Kansas State University's mathematics department, at a time when the state school board was embroiled in a dispute over teaching creationism in schools. The school board's elimination of evolution from science textbooks introduced him to the creationist community, and he says that his time spent with them has convinced him that "the task of reconciling science with faith is far more difficult than is sometimes pretended."

Selected publications

Peer-reviewed papers

Books
The Monty Hall Problem: The Remarkable Story of Math's Most Contentious Brain Teaser, Oxford University Press
Among the Creationists: Dispatches from the Anti-Evolutionist Front Line, Oxford University Press
Taking Sudoku Seriously: The Math Behind the World's Most Popular Pencil Puzzle, Oxford University Press
Games for Your Mind: The History and Future of Logic Puzzles , Princeton University Press

References

James Madison University faculty
Dartmouth College alumni
Living people
21st-century American mathematicians
American atheists
Critics of creationism
Year of birth missing (living people)
Brown University alumni